Guy Abend (born 8 November 1990) is an Israeli footballer.

Early life

Personal
Abend was born in Netanya, Israel to parents Arie and Tali and has both an older brother and sister.  Before his first birthday he and his family would move to Washington, D.C. where he would spend the next six years of his life.  While in Washington he would play soccer at the Jewish Community Center and he would take his love of the sport back to Israel when he was six.  He continued to play soccer with local teams in Netanya.

In 2022, Abend represented the United States in futsal at the 2022 Maccabiah Games, alongside former Louisville City teammate Matthew Fondy.

Youth
Abend joined Maccabi Netanya F.C.'s Youth system when we has fourteen.

Club career

Maccabi Netanya FC
At seventeen Abend signed his first professional contract with Maccabi Netanya F.C. of the Israeli Premier League and he would make his senior debut in the  2008-09 Toto Cup. Over the course of 2 seasons Abend would appear in three Toto Cup matches as well as one match in the league.

Loan to Hapoel Kfar Saba FC
Abend would go on loan with Hapoel Kfar Saba of the Liga Leumit for the 2010-2011 season.

Honors

Club
Hapoel Rishon LeZion
 Toto Cup Leumit: 2012–13

Louisville City FC
USL Cup: 2017

Statistics

References

External links
 
 
 
 

1990 births
Jewish Israeli sportspeople
Living people
Israeli footballers
Maccabi Netanya F.C. players
Hapoel Kfar Saba F.C. players
Hapoel Rishon LeZion F.C. players
Louisville City FC players
Reno 1868 FC players
Saint Louis FC players
Israeli Premier League players
Liga Leumit players
USL Championship players
Footballers from Netanya
Expatriate soccer players in the United States
Israeli expatriates in the United States
Association football midfielders
American men's futsal players
20th-century Israeli Jews
21st-century Israeli Jews